Hartsville Regional Airport  is a city-owned public-use airport located three nautical miles (6 km) northwest of the central business district of Hartsville, a city in Darlington County, South Carolina, United States.

Facilities and aircraft 
It has one runway designated 3/21 with an asphalt surface measuring 5,000 by 75 feet (1,524 x 23 m).

For the 12-month period ending March 12, 2010, the airport had 6,000 aircraft operations, an average of 16 per day: 95% general aviation and 5% military. At that time there were 12 aircraft based at this airport: 92% single-engine and 8% multi-engine.

References

External links 
 Airport page at City of Hartsville website
 Skyline Aviation Services, the fixed-base operator (FBO)
 Aerial image as of 7 February 1994 from USGS The National Map
 

Airports in South Carolina
Buildings and structures in Hartsville, South Carolina
Transportation in Darlington County, South Carolina
Hartsville, South Carolina